Dalila Rodriguez Hernandez (born 1 August 1988) is a Cuban female track cyclist, and part of the national team. She competed in the omnium and individual pursuit event at the 2009 UCI Track Cycling World Championships and in the points race and individual pursuit event at the 2010 UCI Track Cycling World Championships.

References

External links
 
 
 
 

1988 births
Living people
Cuban track cyclists
Cuban female cyclists
Place of birth missing (living people)
Cyclists at the 2011 Pan American Games
Cyclists at the 2007 Pan American Games
Pan American Games medalists in cycling
Pan American Games silver medalists for Cuba
Pan American Games bronze medalists for Cuba
Medalists at the 2011 Pan American Games
21st-century Cuban women
Competitors at the 2006 Central American and Caribbean Games